Alvin Cooper Hayse (April 7, 1921, Detroit - May 1982, Michigan) was an American jazz trombonist.

Early in his career Hayse played with Snookum Russell and Kelly Martin. He joined McKinney's Cotton Pickers in 1939 or 1942, then played with Lionel Hampton from 1943 to 1946. He worked with Milt Buckner in 1950, then returned to duty under Hampton in 1951, remaining with him through 1956. While with Hampton he also recorded with Gigi Gryce and Clifford Brown in Europe. Hayse was the composer of the tune "Sergeant's Mess", recorded by Stan Kenton. He dropped out of the scene after the 1950s and died in obscurity in 1982.

References

"Al Hayse", Grove Jazz online.
Eugene Chadbourne, [ Al Hayse] at Allmusic

Further reading
Leonard Feather, The Encyclopedia of Jazz.

1921 births
1982 deaths
American jazz trombonists
Male trombonists
Musicians from Detroit
20th-century American musicians
20th-century trombonists
Jazz musicians from Michigan
20th-century American male musicians
American male jazz musicians